Habenaria plantaginea is a species of orchid native to Asia.

The specific epithet plantaginea may have originated from the plant's resemblance to the genus Plantago.

Distribution

This orchid species is native to tropical and sub-tropical habitats, in India, Nepal, Sri Lanka, Bangladesh, and Southeast Asia. The plant prefers shady places in wild. In India it grows in moist and dry deciduous forests.
It prefers bushes on rock cervices.

Description
Its flowers are white.

Flowers glabrous white with narrowly lanceolate bracts. Dorsal sepals are erect, obtuse at the tip and prominently 3-nerved. Lateral sepals thick, 4 nerved, lateral petals are narrower than the sepals one nerved, more or less hyaline. Lip trilobed, long-spurred with porrect sidelobes. Ovary is shortly stalked. Tubers is oblong, hairy bear 1 or 2 per plant.

plantaginea
Orchids of Bangladesh
Orchids of Cambodia
Orchids of India
Orchids of Myanmar
Orchids of Nepal
Orchids of Sri Lanka
Orchids of Thailand
Flora of tropical Asia
Plants described in 1835